is a Japanese manga artist. Her series Crest of the Royal Family, which received the 1991 Shogakukan Manga Award for shōjo, has been continuously serialized in Princess since 1976.

Her series Akogare was adapted into a TV drama series, titled Hanayomeishō wa Dare ga Kiru (花嫁衣裳は誰が着る), in 1986. Another series, Attention Please, was adapted from a 1970 TV drama series produced for Japan Airlines. A newer version of the TV drama was produced in 2006.

Works
Akogare (5 volumes)
Attention Please (2 volumes)
Cinderella no Mori (3 volumes)
Crest of the Royal Family (67 volumes)
Hakushaku Reijō (12 volumes)
Kuroi Bishō (4 volumes)
Maboroshi no Hanayome (1 volume)
Nakuna Parikko

Sources:

References

External links
 

20th-century Japanese women writers
21st-century Japanese women writers
1935 births
Japanese female comics artists
Female comics writers
Living people
Women manga artists
Manga artists from Osaka Prefecture